Three battles of the Eastern Front of World War II around the city of Rostov-on-Don on the Sea of Azov are known as the Battle of Rostov:
In the Battle of Rostov (1941), the German 1st Panzer Army captured the city but was driven out by the Soviet 37th Army
In the Battle of Rostov (1942), the German 17th Army captured the city
In the Battle of Rostov (1943), the Soviet Union recaptured the city